Nathan Alan Karns (born November 25, 1987) is an American former professional baseball pitcher. He played in Major League Baseball (MLB) for the Washington Nationals, Tampa Bay Rays, Seattle Mariners, Kansas City Royals, and Baltimore Orioles.

Career

Amateur
Karns attended James W. Martin High School in Arlington, Texas, where he played for the school's baseball team. He enrolled at Texas Tech University, where he played college baseball for the Texas Tech Red Raiders baseball team. In 2008, he played collegiate summer baseball with the Falmouth Commodores of the Cape Cod Baseball League.

Washington Nationals
The Washington Nationals selected Karns in the 12th round of the 2009 Major League Baseball draft. His professional career was delayed as he had shoulder surgery in 2010, and didn't make his minor league debut until 2011.

In 2012, he started at Class A Hagerstown, and then was promoted to Class A Advanced Potomac. His combined record was 11–4, and was named the Nationals Minor Pitcher of the Year in 2012. He was added to the 40-man roster on November 20, 2012.

When Ross Detwiler suffered an injury, Karns was called up to take his place in the pitching rotation, and made his major league debut on May 28, 2013. He started, and lasted  innings, allowing three earned runs, five hits, and two walks, in a game the Nats won, 9–3.

Tampa Bay Rays
On February 13, 2014, Karns was traded to the Tampa Bay Rays in exchange for José Lobatón, Felipe Rivero and Drew Vettleson. Karns spent the majority of the season in the Rays' AAA system. He finished the season appearing in two starts.

Due to numerous injuries to begin the 2015 season, the Rays gave Karns a rotation spot for opening day. On July 21, 2015, pitching against the Philadelphia Phillies in Philadelphia, Karns hit his first Major League home run as Rays defeated the Phillies, 1–0.  It was the first time since 1962 that an American League pitcher had homered in a 1–0 game. Karns appeared in 26 starts for the Rays, averaging nine strikeouts per nine innings despite  logging just under six innings per start.

Seattle Mariners
On November 5, 2015, the Rays traded Karns, C. J. Riefenhauser, and Boog Powell to the Seattle Mariners for Brad Miller, Danny Farquhar, and Logan Morrison. Karns began the Mariners season in the rotation but was then demoted to the bullpen after struggling. He made eight relief appearances before being shut down for the season in early August with a back strain. Karns finished the season with a 6–2 record, 5.15 ERA, and 101 strikeouts in 94 innings.

Kansas City Royals
On January 6, 2017, Karns was traded to the Kansas City Royals for Jarrod Dyson. His 2017 season with Kansas City was cut short due to injury, undergoing surgery for thoracic outlet syndrome in July. Karns finished the season 2–2 with a 4.17 ERA in nine games (eight starts). He missed the entire 2018 season with right elbow inflammation. Karns elected free agency after the Royals outrighted him to the minors on October 31, 2018.

Baltimore Orioles
Karns signed a one-year contract with the Baltimore Orioles on February 7, 2019. The deal was worth a reported $800,000 guaranteed, with $200,000 in incentive bonuses for 100 innings pitched. He appeared in four games before being placed on the disabled list with a forearm strain. On July 26, Karns was designated for assignment and outrighted on August 2. Karns was released on August 7, 2019.

Personal life
Nathan Karns got married in December 2015 to Jennifer Karns (formerly Jennifer Boecker).

Karns is currently a realtor for real estate firm Rogers Healy and Associates Real Estate in Dallas, Texas.

References

External links

Texas Tech Red Raiders bio

1987 births
Living people
People from Franklin, Pennsylvania
Baseball players from Pennsylvania
Major League Baseball pitchers
Washington Nationals players
Tampa Bay Rays players
Seattle Mariners players
Kansas City Royals players
Baltimore Orioles players
Texas Tech Red Raiders baseball players
Falmouth Commodores players
Gulf Coast Nationals players
Auburn Doubledays players
Hagerstown Suns players
Potomac Nationals players
Harrisburg Senators players
Durham Bulls players
Martin High School (Arlington, Texas) alumni